William W. Martin (born in London) was a professional footballer, who played for Huddersfield Town.

References

Sources

Year of birth missing
Year of death missing
English footballers
England amateur international footballers
Footballers from Greater London
Association football defenders
English Football League players
Huddersfield Town A.F.C. players